Zoot Allures is the 22nd album by the American rock musician Frank Zappa, released in October 1976 and his only release on the Warner Bros. Records label. Due to a lawsuit with his former manager, Herb Cohen, Zappa's recording contract was temporarily reassigned from DiscReet Records to Warner Bros.

Title
The title is a pun on the French expression "Zut alors!", which conveys mild surprise.

Album information
The album was originally conceptualized as a double LP, but Zappa rearranged, edited, and shortened the track listing to what was eventually released as a single album. Zappa played a test pressing of the original album for Circus magazine in 1976, which reported a radically different, though slightly erroneous track listing that included "Sleep Dirt", "The Ocean Is the Ultimate Solution", "Filthy Habits", and "Night of the Iron Sausage". The former three tracks eventually surfaced on the 1979 Sleep Dirt and the posthumous Läther; "Night of the Iron Sausage" remains unreleased, but was seemingly intended to be a guitar solo of fair length. 

Zappa recorded the album after completing a world tour with a band including Napoleon Murphy Brock on tenor sax and vocals, Andre Lewis on keyboards, Roy Estrada on bass and Terry Bozzio on drums.  However, this band appeared only on the live track "Black Napkins" with only Bozzio retained to play on the sessions, although Lewis and Estrada contributed backing vocals. After Zappa's death, one of the band's 1976 concerts was released as FZ:OZ. 

By the time Zoot Allures was finished, Zappa had formed a new live band, including Bozzio, bass player Patrick O'Hearn and keyboardist Eddie Jobson. This group was pictured on the cover with Zappa, although the latter two did not perform on the album.

Songs
"Black Napkins", one of several guitar-driven pieces on Zoot Allures, began life accompanied by themes that would later make up "Sleep Dirt". The performance heard on the album was culled from Zappa's February 3, 1976 performance in Osaka, Japan, though it was edited for the official release. Along with "Zoot Allures" and "The Torture Never Stops", "Black Napkins" became a signature piece for Zappa, featuring heavily in nearly every subsequent tour and several official releases.

"Wonderful Wino" was originally released on Jeff Simmons' 1970 album, Lucille Has Messed My Mind Up. The album, produced partially by Zappa (though credited as "La Marr Bruister"), also included the title track, which later appeared on 1979's Joe's Garage.

On the liner notes to 1979's Sheik Yerbouti, Zappa notes that "Friendly Little Finger" (from Zoot Allures) was created using xenochrony.

The album's sound is influenced by heavy metal music, particularly that on the song "Ms. Pinky".

CD releases
The first CD edition of Zoot Allures, released by Rykodisc, has different mixes and edits than the original vinyl LP. The vinyl contains a longer edit of "Disco Boy" including a count-off by a drum machine (the first three seconds) and a longer fade-out making the track's duration 5:27, instead of the original CD duration of 5:11. The 2012 remastered CD version from Universal Music uses the original vinyl mixes and edits, with improved sound quality over the original CD.

Track listing
All tracks written by Frank Zappa, except "Wonderful Wino", written by Zappa and Jeff Simmons.

Personnel

Musicians
 Frank Zappa – guitar (all tracks), bass (1, 3–7, 9), lead vocals (1, 3, 4, 5, 7, 9), synthesizer (1, 4, 5, 9), keyboards (3, 5, 7, 9), director of recreational activities (3)
 Terry Bozzio – drums (all tracks), backing vocals (5, 9)
Also featuring
 Davey Moiré – lead vocals (1), backing vocals (1, 9), engineer
 Andre Lewis – organ (2), vocals (2), backing vocals (5, 9)
 Roy Estrada – bass (2), vocals (2), backing vocals (4, 5, 9), drone bass (6)
 Napoleon Murphy Brock – vocals (2)
 Ruth Underwood – synthesizer (4, 6, 7), marimba (6, 8)
 Captain Beefheart – harmonica (4, 5) (credited as "Donnie Vliet")
 Ruben Ladron de Guevara – backing vocals (5)
Ian Underwood – saxophone (6, 7)
Bruce Fowler – trombone (6, 7)
Sal Marquez – trumpet (6, 7)
 Dave Parlato – bass (8)
 Lu Ann Neil – harp (8)
 Miss Sparky [Linda Sue Parker] (credited as "Sparkie Parker") – backing vocals (9)

Production staff
 Arnie Acosta – mastering
 Amy Bernstein – layout design
 Michael Braunstein – engineer
 Gary Heery – photography
 Cal Schenkel – design
 Bob Stone – digital remastering

Release history

Charts

References

External links
Lyrics and details
Release information

1976 albums
Albums produced by Frank Zappa
Frank Zappa albums
Warner Records albums